Kateland is a historic house located about  miles north of the town of Boyce in Grant Parish, Louisiana.

Built in c.1830, it is a rambling house started as an open dogtrot.  It is the only known surviving antebellum structure in Grant Parish.

In the 1880s the dogtrot corridor was enclosed and the house was extended.  A rear extension with a side gallery was built in about 1900, and that gallery was enclosed in the 1920s, when the front gallery's columns were also replaced.

The house was listed on the National Register of Historic Places on April 12, 1984.

See also
National Register of Historic Places listings in Grant Parish, Louisiana

References

Houses on the National Register of Historic Places in Louisiana
Houses completed in 1830
Grant Parish, Louisiana
Dogtrot architecture in Louisiana